The Scottish Pipe Band Association of South America (SPBASA), is the pipe band association currently comprising Argentina, Brazil, Chile and Uruguay.  It approved its first constitution on December 20, 2003 in Buenos Aires, Argentina; and was officially inaugurated on April 17, 2004 at the First South American Pipe Band Gathering in Montevideo, Uruguay.  The comparatively low number of pipe bands and the number of countries encompassed are the principal reasons behind this pipe band association being so unique.

SPBASA additionally has served its members by liaising with multiple organizations such as the Alliance of North American Pipe Band Associations (ANAPBA), the Royal Edinburgh Military Tattoo, the Royal Scottish Pipe Band Association, local St. Andrew's Societies, local British associations, and others.

Member bands
Argentina
 St. Andrew's Society of the River Plate Pipe Band
 Highland Thistle Pipe Band
 South American Piping Association Pipe Band
 Bariloche Highlanders Pipe Band

Brazil
 Banda Brasil Caledonia
 St. Andrew's Society of São Paulo Pipes and Drums
 Wolney Highlanders
 SP Scots

Chile
 Chilean Highlands Pipes and Drums
 Lord Cochrane Pipe Band
 Santiago Metropolitan Pipe Band

Uruguay
 City of Montevideo Pipe Band
 Latitude 33 Pipe Band

Gatherings
The South American Pipe Band Gatherings have been the Association's most iconic and comprehensive events. These Gatherings, hosted by member pipe bands themselves on a rotational basis, occur approximately every 18 months. The first took place in Montevideo, Uruguay.  Gatherings are typically opened by a Massed Bands Parade along a major city avenue, including all participating pipe bands and guests. At the core event, each pipe band has a 30-minute presentation.  The Gatherings have hosted pipe band competitions and soloist competitions.  Piping, drumming and highland dancing celebrities have been invited to each Gathering as instructors and competition adjudicators.

The rotation of Gatherings was held up to the 8th South American Pipe Band Gathering, (hosted in Bariloche, Argentina); interrupted by the COVID-19 pandemic.  Plans for the 9th Gathering are underway, but subject to the conclusion of the pandemic and the recovery of local economies.

The updated schedule of past and future Gatherings is published on the  SPBASA website.

Management
SPBASA's Board of Officers is composed of the President, Vice President, Secretary, Treasurer and Marketing Officer.

SPBASA's decisions are ruled by an Executive Committee formed by representatives of each pipe band, and in some cases representatives of independent pipers and drummers of each country.

Translations
"Scottish Pipe Band Association of South America", is officially translated into Spanish as "Asociación Sudamericana de Bandas de Gaitas Escocesas", and into Portuguese as "Associação Sulamericana de Bandas Escocesas".

External links
 

Pipe band associations
Scottish diaspora
Music organisations based in Argentina
Music organisations based in Brazil
Music organisations based in Chile
Music organizations based in Uruguay